The 2019 ICC Women's Qualifier EAP was a cricket tournament that was held in Vanuatu in May 2019. The matches in the tournament were played as Women's Twenty20 Internationals (WT20Is), with the top team progressing to both the 2019 ICC Women's World Twenty20 Qualifier and the 2021 Women's Cricket World Cup Qualifier tournaments.

The opening days of fixtures saw Papua New Guinea win both their matches, with Ravina Oa taking a five-wicket haul against Vanuatu in the first match, and Natasha Ambo taking five wickets in the second match, against Indonesia. In the final match of the tournament, Papua New Guinea beat Samoa by seven wickets to win the EAP Qualifier.

However, on 8 November 2021, Papua New Guinea announced that they had been forced to withdraw from the 2021 Women's Cricket World Cup Qualifier tournament due to several players recording positive tests for COVID-19.

Teams
The following teams competed in the tournament:

Points table

Fixtures

References

External links
 Series home at ESPN Cricinfo

 
 
2019 in women's cricket
International women's cricket competitions in Vanuatu
International cricket competitions in 2019